was a prominent Japanese politician from 1980 until her retirement in 2005. She was the first female Lower House Speaker in Japan, the highest position a female politician has ever held in the country's modern history, as well as the country's first female Opposition Leader.

Biography

Early years
Doi was born in Hyōgo Prefecture and graduated from Doshisha University, where she studied law. She was elected to the House of Representatives, the lower house of the Diet, as a member of the Japan Socialist Party (JSP) in 1969, representing the 2nd district of Hyōgo. She spent her first ten years in the House on the sidelines, but came to national attention in 1980 when she was highly critical of Japan's unequal treatment of women, specifically about women-only home economics degrees and the father-dominated family registration law. She pressured the Diet to sign the Convention on the Elimination of All Forms of Discrimination Against Women (CEDAW) in 1985.

Doi became Vice Chair of the JSP in 1983 and the first female leader of a political party division in Japanese history in 1986, as chair of the JSP Central Policy Division.  The JSP took a record high number of seats in 1990, when it won 136 seats in the House of Representatives, partly because of Doi's popularity, but she resigned her party post in 1991, in the wake of the Gulf War.

In 1994, no party held a majority in the House and the JSP took the lead in forming a coalition government. The JSP's president, Tomiichi Murayama, became Prime Minister. However, the coalition collapsed in 1996 and, following a disastrous electoral defeat for the JSP later that year, Doi returned to lead the party.

Party leader
Doi was a popular opposition politician, but as party leader she saw her party collapse. Her chief act as leader was to rename the JSP as the Social Democratic Party (SDP), in 1996.  Moderating the characters for "Socialism" by adding "Democratic" to the party name, Doi said that she wanted to form a more moderate party and bring more women into politics. Doi was responsible for recruiting young women with grass-roots activist backgrounds, such as Kiyomi Tsujimoto, into the party.

In 1998, former members of the JSP and of other parties formed the Democratic Party of Japan, and the SDP became a third-tier opposition party, watching its numbers steadily decline. The SDP was a minor party by the time the reality of the Japanese abductees taken by North Korea came to light in 2003. Doi's status plummeted as her earlier statements telling abductee families to "get over it" were shown on television, as was Doi's comment in Pyongyang in 1987 at the birthday party of Kim Il-sung: "We JSP members respect the glorious success of DPRK under the great leader Kim Il Sung." Doi apologized to the families and claimed that North Korean authorities had been deceiving her all along, but resigned the party leadership soon after. In 1989, Doi, together with Naoto Kan,  Keiko Chiba, Tomiichi Murayama and other 129 Japanese politicians from Japan Socialist Party, Socialist Democratic Federation and Komeito signed a petition to the South Korean President Roh Tae-woo for the release of North Korean spies including Sin Gwang-su who had kidnapped a Japanese person in June 1980.

Loss of seats
Doi lost her directly elected seat in the House of Representatives in the 2003 election but remained in the House, having won a seat under the proportional representation system. She lost this seat in 2005 elections.

Death
She died in a hospital in Hyogo Prefecture of pneumonia on September 20, 2014, at the age of 85.

References

 
 
  On the North Korea Question An interview with Fuwa Tetsuzo, JCP Central Committee Chair, Japan Press Weekly, January 2004

|-

1928 births
2014 deaths
People from Kobe
Doshisha University alumni
Scholars of constitutional law
Social Democratic Party (Japan) politicians
Female members of the House of Representatives (Japan)
Members of the House of Representatives (Japan)
Speakers of the House of Representatives (Japan)
21st-century Japanese politicians
21st-century Japanese women politicians
Women opposition leaders
Women legal scholars
Politicians from Hyōgo Prefecture
Deaths from pneumonia in Japan